Helena Ejeson-Gould (born 3 January 1981) is a Swedish former professional tennis player.

Biography
A right-handed player from Kalmar, Ejeson played on the professional tour in the early 2000s and was most prominent in the doubles format, with a best world ranking of 198.

In 2002 she was a doubles quarter-finalist in two WTA Tour tournaments, Finland's Nordic Light Open and the Japan Open, beating Maria Sharapova/Maria Kirilenko in the latter.

Ejeson won three ITF doubles titles during her career, which included a $25,000 event in Nottingham in 2003, partnering Åsa Svensson.

Retiring in 2004, she went on to study psychology at Lund University and was married in 2010 to Alastair Gould.

ITF finals

Doubles: 10 (3–7)

References

External links
 
 

1981 births
Living people
Swedish female tennis players
People from Kalmar Municipality
Sportspeople from Kalmar County
20th-century Swedish women
21st-century Swedish women